Microphysogobio kachekensis is a species of cyprinid fish endemic to China and Vietnam.

References

Microphysogobio
Fish described in 1926